In chemistry, many authors consider an organic compound to be any chemical compound that contains carbon-hydrogen or carbon-carbon bonds, although the definition of "organic" versus "inorganic" varies from author to author, and is a topic of debate. For example, methane is considered organic, but whether halides of carbon without hydrogen (e.g. carbon tetrachloride ) are organic or inorganic varies from author to author.

Due to carbon's ability to catenate (form chains with other carbon atoms), millions of organic compounds are known. The study of the properties, reactions, and syntheses of organic compounds comprise the discipline known as organic chemistry.  For historical reasons, a few classes of carbon-containing compounds (e.g., carbonate salts and cyanide salts), along with a few other exceptions (e.g., carbon dioxide, hydrogen cyanide), are not classified as organic compounds and are considered inorganic.  Other than those just named, little consensus exists among chemists on precisely which carbon-containing compounds are excluded, making any rigorous definition of an organic compound elusive.

Although organic compounds make up only a small percentage of Earth's crust, they are of central importance because all known life is based on organic compounds. Living things incorporate inorganic carbon compounds into organic compounds through a network of processes (the carbon cycle) that begins with the conversion of carbon dioxide and a hydrogen source like water into  simple sugars and other organic molecules by autotrophic organisms using light (photosynthesis) or other sources of energy.  Most synthetically-produced organic compounds are ultimately derived from petrochemicals consisting mainly of hydrocarbons, which are themselves formed from the high pressure and temperature degradation of organic matter underground over geological timescales.  This ultimate derivation notwithstanding, organic compounds are no longer defined as compounds originating in living things, as they were historically.

In chemical nomenclature, an organyl group, frequently represented by the letter R, refers to any monovalent substituent whose open valence is on a carbon atom.

Definitions of organic vs inorganic
For historical reasons discussed below, a few types of carbon-containing compounds, such as carbides, carbonates (excluding carbonate esters), simple oxides of carbon (for example, CO and CO2), and cyanides are considered inorganic. Different forms (allotropes) of pure carbon, such as diamond, graphite, fullerenes, and carbon nanotubes are also excluded because they are simple substances composed of only a single element and therefore are not generally considered to be chemical compounds.

It is also important to note that the word "organic" in this context does not mean "natural."

History

Vitalism

Vitalism was a widespread conception that substances found in organic nature are formed from the chemical elements by the action of a "vital force" or "life-force" (vis vitalis) that only living organisms possess.

In the 1810s, Jöns Jacob Berzelius argued that a regulative force must exist within living bodies. Berzelius also contended that compounds could be distinguished by whether they required any organisms in their synthesis (organic compounds) or whether they did not (inorganic compounds). Vitalism taught that formation of these "organic" compounds were fundamentally different from the "inorganic" compounds that could be obtained from the elements by chemical manipulations in laboratories.

Vitalism survived for a short period after the formulation of modern ideas about the atomic theory and chemical elements. It first came under question in 1824, when Friedrich Wöhler synthesized oxalic acid, a compound known to occur only in living organisms, from cyanogen. A further experiment was Wöhler's 1828 synthesis of urea from the inorganic salts potassium cyanate and ammonium sulfate. Urea had long been considered an "organic" compound, as it was known to occur only in the urine of living organisms. Wöhler's experiments were followed by many others, in which increasingly complex "organic" substances were produced from "inorganic" ones without the involvement of any living organism, thus disproving vitalism.

Modern classification and ambiguities

Although vitalism has been discredited, scientific nomenclature retains the distinction between organic and inorganic compounds. The modern meaning of organic compound is any compound that contains a significant amount of carbon—even though many of the organic compounds known today have no connection to any substance found in living organisms.  The term carbogenic has been proposed by E. J. Corey as a modern alternative to organic, but this neologism remains relatively obscure.

The organic compound L-isoleucine molecule presents some features typical of organic compounds:  carbon–carbon bonds, carbon–hydrogen bonds, as well as covalent bonds from carbon to oxygen and to nitrogen.

As described in detail below, any definition of organic compound that uses simple, broadly-applicable criteria turns out to be unsatisfactory, to varying degrees.  The modern, commonly accepted definition of organic compound essentially amounts to any carbon-containing compound, excluding several classes of substances traditionally considered 'inorganic'.  However, the list of substances so excluded varies from author to author.  Still, it is generally agreed upon that there are (at least) a few carbon-containing compounds that should not be considered organic.  For instance, almost all authorities would require the exclusion of alloys that contain carbon, including steel (which contains cementite, Fe3C), as well as other metal and semimetal carbides (including "ionic" carbides, e.g, Al4C3 and CaC2 and "covalent" carbides, e.g. B4C and SiC, and graphite intercalation compounds, e.g. KC8). Other compounds and materials that are considered 'inorganic' by most authorities include: metal carbonates, simple oxides (CO, CO2, and arguably, C3O2), the allotropes of carbon, cyanide derivatives not containing an organic residue (e.g., KCN, (CN)2, BrCN, CNO−, etc.), and heavier analogs thereof (e.g., CP− 'cyaphide anion', CSe2, COS; although CS2 'carbon disulfide' is often classed as an organic solvent).  Halides of carbon without hydrogen (e.g., CF4 and CClF3), phosgene (COCl2), carboranes, metal carbonyls (e.g., nickel carbonyl), mellitic anhydride (C12O9), and other exotic oxocarbons are also considered inorganic by some authorities.

Nickel carbonyl (Ni(CO)4) and other metal carbonyls are often volatile liquids, like many organic compounds, yet they contain only carbon bonded to a transition metal and to oxygen, and are often prepared directly from metal and carbon monoxide.  Nickel carbonyl is typically classified as an organometallic compound as it satisfies the broad definition that organometallic chemistry covers all compounds that contain at least one carbon to metal covalent bond; it is debatable whether organometallic compounds form a subset of organic compounds, however. For example, the evidence of covalent Fe-C bonding in cementite, a major component of steel, places it within this broad definition of organometallic, yet steel and other carbon-containing alloys are seldom regarded as organic compounds.  Thus, it is unclear whether the definition of organometallic should be narrowed, whether these considerations imply that organometallic compounds are not necessarily organic, or both.

Metal complexes with organic ligands but no carbon-metal bonds (e.g., Cu(OAc)2) are not considered organometallic; instead, they are classed as metalorganic.  Likewise, it is also unclear whether metalorganic compounds should automatically be considered organic.

The relatively narrow definition of organic compounds as those containing C-H bonds excludes compounds that are (historically and practically) considered organic. Neither urea nor oxalic acid are organic by this definition, yet they were two key compounds in the vitalism debate. The IUPAC Blue Book on organic nomenclature specifically mentions urea and oxalic acid. Other compounds lacking C-H bonds but traditionally considered organic include benzenehexol, mesoxalic acid, and carbon tetrachloride. Mellitic acid, which contains no C-H bonds, is considered a possible organic substance in Martian soil.  Terrestrially, it, and its anhydride, mellitic anhydride, are associated with the mineral mellite (Al2C6(COO)6·16H2O).

A slightly broader definition of the organic compound includes all compounds bearing C-H or C-C bonds.  This would still exclude urea.  Moreover, this definition still leads to somewhat arbitrary divisions in sets of carbon-halogen compounds.  For example, CF4 and CCl4 would be considered by this rule to be "inorganic", whereas CF3H, CHCl3, and C2Cl6 would be organic, though these compounds share many physical and chemical properties.

Classification

Organic compounds may be classified in a variety of ways. One major distinction is between natural and synthetic compounds. Organic compounds can also be classified or subdivided by the presence of heteroatoms, e.g., organometallic compounds, which feature bonds between carbon and a metal, and organophosphorus compounds, which feature bonds between carbon and a phosphorus.

Another distinction, based on the size of organic compounds, distinguishes between small molecules and polymers.

Natural compounds

Natural compounds refer to those that are produced by plants or animals. Many of these are still extracted from natural sources because they would be more expensive to produce artificially. Examples include most sugars, some alkaloids and terpenoids, certain nutrients such as vitamin B12, and, in general, those natural products with large or stereoisometrically complicated molecules present in reasonable concentrations in living organisms.

Further compounds of prime importance in biochemistry are antigens, carbohydrates, enzymes, hormones, lipids and fatty acids, neurotransmitters, nucleic acids, proteins, peptides and amino acids, lectins, vitamins, and fats and oils.

Synthetic compounds
Compounds that are prepared by reaction of other compounds are known as "synthetic". They may be either compounds that are already found in plants/animals or those artificial compounds that do not occur naturally.

Most polymers (a category that includes all plastics and rubbers) are organic synthetic or semi-synthetic compounds.

Biotechnology

Many organic compounds—two examples are ethanol and insulin—are manufactured industrially using organisms such as bacteria and yeast. Typically, the DNA of an organism is altered to express compounds not ordinarily produced by the organism. Many such biotechnology-engineered compounds did not previously exist in nature.

Databases
 The CAS database is the most comprehensive repository for data on organic compounds. The search tool SciFinder is offered.
 The Beilstein database contains information on 9.8 million substances, covers the scientific literature from 1771 to the present, and is today accessible via Reaxys. Structures and a large diversity of physical and chemical properties are available for each substance, with reference to original literature.
 PubChem contains 18.4 million entries on compounds and especially covers the field of medicinal chemistry.

A great number of more specialized databases exist for diverse branches of organic chemistry.

Structure determination

The main tools are proton and carbon-13 NMR spectroscopy, IR Spectroscopy, Mass spectrometry, UV/Vis Spectroscopy and X-ray crystallography.

See also
 
 List of chemical compounds
 List of organic compounds

References

External links
 Organic Compounds Database
 Organic Materials Database

 
Organic chemistry